General elections were held in Vanuatu on 30 November 1995. Ni-Vanuatu voters were invited to elect the 50 members of the national Parliament.

The Unity Front, a coalition comprising the Vanua'aku Pati (led by Donald Kalpokas), the Melanesian Progressive Party (led by Barak Sopé) and Tan Union (led by Vincent Boulekone) won 20 seats, of which the VP won 13, the MPP 5 and the TU 2. The Union of Moderate Parties, led by incumbent Prime Minister Maxime Carlot Korman, won 17. The National United Party, led by former Prime Minister Walter Lini, won 9.

The francophone Union of Moderate Parties and the anglophone National United Party formed a coalition government, with Serge Vohor (UMP) as Prime Minister and Walter Lini as deputy Prime Minister. Voter turnout was 72.4%.

Electoral system
Most members were elected by single non-transferable vote in multi-seat districts of two to seven seats. Four members were elected through first-past-the-post voting ins single-member constituencies.

Results

See also
List of members of the Parliament of Vanuatu (1995–1998)

References

Vanuatu
General election
Elections in Vanuatu
Vanuatu